Santiago Texacuangos is a municipality in the San Salvador department of El Salvador.

Municipalities of the San Salvador Department